Michael Theimer (born 1950) is an American sports shooter. He competed in the men's 50 metre running target event at the 1976 Summer Olympics.

References

1950 births
Living people
American male sport shooters
Olympic shooters of the United States
Shooters at the 1976 Summer Olympics
Sportspeople from Oklahoma City